Majhiputtuga is a small village in Talatampara Panchayat in Kanchili mandal of Srikakulam district in Andhra Pradesh.

References
Villages in Srikakulam district